Formula (released 1995) is an album by industrial/metal band OLD (Old Lady Drivers).  It is their last full-length to date, and the group was condensed to a duo, with James Plotkin handling all instruments and Alan Dubin handling all vocals.

The album is a rather drastic departure from OLD's earlier works, abandoning much of their extreme metal roots to instead explore techno, IDM and electro, with Dubin's vocals processed through a Vocoder.

According to Terrorizer Magazine (article named "Lost Classics & Follies"), it is allegedly the lowest-selling album in the history of Earache Records. Though not well received at the time of its release, retrospective reviews are more positive. Allmusic referred to the album as a notable precursor of industrial techno.

Track listing
All songs written and arranged by Dubin/Plotkin.
Last Look – 10:58
Break (You) – 5:57
Devolve – 5:53
Under Glass – 7:54
Thug – 4:59
Rid – 5:44
Amoeba – 8:17

Personnel
Alan Dubin: All vocals
James Plotkin: Guitars, bass, keyboards, drum programming, tapes, sampler

1995 albums
OLD (band) albums
Earache Records albums
Albums produced by James Plotkin